Ned Jarrett (born October 12, 1932) is an American retired race car driver and two-time NASCAR Grand National Series champion.

Because of his calm demeanor, he became known as "Gentleman Ned Jarrett". He is the father of former drivers Glenn Jarrett and Dale Jarrett.

Racing career
Jarrett was introduced to cars early in life: his father let him drive the family car to church on Sunday mornings when he was nine years old.  Jarrett started working for his father in the sawmill by the time he was 12, but racing was what he wanted.

Ned drove in his first race in 1952 at Hickory Motor Speedway (North Carolina). He drove a Sportsman Series Ford that he co-owned with his brother-in-law, and finished tenth.  This did not go over well with his father.  His father told him he could work on cars but not drive them. Once, his brother-in-law was sick for a race and asked Jarrett to fill in for him. Jarrett used his brother-in-law's name and came in second in that race. That worked out so smoothly that Jarrett drove in a few more races under an assumed name, but was finally caught by his father after winning a race. His father told him if he was going to drive to at least use his own name.

Jarrett raced in his first Grand National Series race in the 1953 Southern 500 at Darlington Speedway. He was out after 10 laps after the engine leaked oil.

Jarrett was the 1955 track champion at Hickory Motor Speedway.

Jarrett came in second driving in the Sportsman Series in 1956, and won the 1957 and 1958 championships.

In 1959, he was looking to pursue a career in the Grand National Series. He purchased a Junior Johnson Ford for $2,000. He did not have enough money to cover the check, so he waited until the bank closed to write the check, entered two races, and won them both to cover the cost of his car.

In 1960, he won five races, before winning the 1961 Grand National championship with 22 top-five finishes and 34 top-ten finishes out of 46 races, with one win.

One indicator of the personal character of "Gentleman Ned" Jarrett is demonstrated by the decision to sell his 1961 (raced as No. 11) Chevrolet to Wendell Scott (the first NASCAR African American driver) who travelled from his Virginia home to Jarrett's shop on West "A" Street in Newton, NC, to take delivery of the Chevy Bel Air (raced the previous season) when Jarrett changed to Fords in 1962. Scott hauled the old blue coupe away on the back of an open trailer. Bobby Isaac frequented the shop on West A Street during this period when Bud Alman was the crew chief assisted by mechanic "John Carl" Ervin. Ervin later became crew chief to Jarrett and the No. 11 Fords.

Jarrett was once overheard talking with Alman and  Ervin about the need to "run all the races" to win the championship. Schedules in those days sometimes included more than one race per week. Among the unique tracks of the early era was Bowman Gray Stadium in Winston-Salem, North Carolina, which was actually the area around the football field inside the Bowman Gray Stadium. The race schedule was difficult. The race teams were smaller, often having only one or two paid members. For example, Jarrett required significant effort in order to prepare for the 1963 Daytona 500 race when the latest "fastback" body was introduced by Ford. Alman and Ervin removed (air-chiseled) most of the body from a 1962 Ford "fatback" dirt car. Next, the two air-chiseled the new body from a 1963 fastback and fitted it onto the old body and chassis. This hybrid body  became the car Jarrett drove to third in the "fastback Ford" sweep (top five positions) at Daytona that year.

In 1964, Jarrett joined team owner Bondy Long and with the support of Ford won 15 times (one of which was with Charles Robinson) but lost the championship to Richard Petty. Jarrett picked up his first superspeedway win, at Atlanta Motor Speedway.

In 1965, Jarrett became a star when he won 13 races and another Grand National championship. He placed among the top five in 42 of the 54 races that he ran.

The 1965 Southern 500 at Darlington Raceway was one of the wildest races in NASCAR history. Rookie driver Buren Skeen died after two cars ran into the side of his car in the early laps. Sam McQuagg was leading the race, when Cale Yarborough tried to muscle past McQuagg for the lead. Yarborough flew over the guardrail, rolled around six times, and ended up at the end of the parking lot by a light post. Yarborough waved to the crowd as he walked back to the pits. A video clip of the wreck was used on ABC's Wide World of Sports for several years. With 44 laps left, Fred Lorenzen and Darel Dieringer were fighting for the lead far ahead of Jarrett. Lorenzen's motor expired, and even before he could get into the pits Dieringer's motor started smoking too. Dieringer continued at a slower pace to finish third. The race was won by Jarrett by 14 laps and 2 car lengths or 19.25 miles, which is the farthest margin of victory in NASCAR history (in terms of miles). Jarrett won the season's final race at Dog Track Speedway to clinch the championship; it ended up being his final NASCAR win.

In 1966, Jarrett raced in only 21 of 49 races, achieving eight top ten finishes. When Ford announced that they were withdrawing from NASCAR, Jarrett decided that it was time to retire at the age of 34. Jarrett is the only driver to retire as the NASCAR champion.

Ervin remained as a crew chief to the Jarrett family for years. Ervin later would become crew chief for Dale Jarrett in the No. 32 Busch car owned by DAJ racing.

Jarrett left racing and dealt in real estate and other business ventures before coming back to racing as a broadcaster. He also was the track promoter for Hickory Motor Speedway.

Racing announcer
In the early 1960s, Ned began a radio program on WNNC in Newton, North Carolina. His taped show was replayed and locally sponsored, in part by station owner Earl Holder, who gave him both a taping facility and recording studio time for a moderate rate to fill in local programming. It is believed by some that this radio station, WNNC, where Dr. Jerry Punch also began his career on the local high school radio station staff in 1965, was probably the beginning of Jarrett's radio career. Jarrett would sometimes record more than one radio show at a time in order to facilitate the distance required to compete in what was then the "Grand National" circuit of NASCAR.

Jarrett gives much credit to his taking a Dale Carnegie class for his success as a broadcaster and in life.

Later, in 1978, Jarrett became a radio broadcaster for MRN Radio. He interviewed U.S. President Ronald Reagan live at the 1984 Firecracker 400 at Daytona International Speedway, the race famous as Richard Petty's 200th win. Jarrett also hosted a daily radio program about racing on MRN Radio called "Ned Jarrett's World of Racing" until May 15, 2009, when he announced he would retire from the program. Joe Moore became its new host the following Monday, May 18.

Jarrett was a television broadcaster on CBS, first as a pit reporter from 1979 to 1984, and later as color analyst from 1984 to 2000; he was also color analyst on ESPN from 1988 to 2000. He called several of NASCAR's more memorable television moments. He called his son Dale's first victory (in his 129th race) in the 1991 Champion Spark Plug 400 at the Michigan International Speedway. Dale banged Davey Allison's fender at the finish line in what was then the closest finish in NASCAR history. Another famous moment was when he called Dale's victory at the 1993 Daytona 500, breaking impartiality and openly siding with his son on the last lap and coaching him home to victory over Dale Earnhardt. Embarrassed by his show of favoritism, he tried to apologize to Earnhardt after the race, but Earnhardt merely smiled and said, "I'm a father, too."

In addition, Jarrett was a host for the original Inside Winston Cup Racing on TNN and NASCAR Tech on FSN.

On May 26, 2007 Ned returned to the booth to call the Carquest Auto Parts 300 Busch race alongside Andy Petree, Jerry Punch, and his son, 1999 Cup Champ, Dale Jarrett.

In 2015, as part of Darlington returning to its traditional Labor Day weekend, a throwback weekend was formed. As part of the throwback weekend, Ned Jarrett, along with his son Dale Jarrett and Ken Squier, called part of the 66th annual Southern 500. The team was reunited for part of the broadcast of the Southern 500  race in 2016 and 2017.

Awards
As of 2004, Jarrett had been inducted in 12 motorsports and sports Halls of Fame.

He was inducted into the Motorsports Hall of Fame of America in 1997.

On October 13, 2010, Jarrett was selected to be inducted into the NASCAR Hall of Fame as one of the 5 NASCAR Hall of Fame inductees of the 2011 class.

He was inducted into the 2011 class of the NASCAR Hall of Fame on May 23, 2011.

Head of racing family
Ned is the father of Dale Jarrett, who earned his lone NASCAR championship in 1999 and currently is a race broadcaster for NBC Sports. Ned and Dale became the second father-son combination to win Cup championships (after Lee Petty and Richard Petty). Ned has spotted for Dale in the past. Ned's other son is Glenn Jarrett, who was a sporadic Busch Series driver and had a few Cup Series starts in the 1980s. Glenn now covers UHF television as a race broadcaster. Ned also has a daughter Patti. Patti is married to Jimmy Makar, who worked with Dale Jarrett for three years at Joe Gibbs Racing, and won the 2000 championship as crew chief for Bobby Labonte. Dale's son Jason Jarrett also had a few Busch and Cup starts, with wins in the ARCA Re/Max Series.

Personal life
Ned was the son of Homer Keith Jarrett (1908–1983) and his wife, Eoline Marie (nee Leatherman) (1910–2002). They were married February 8, 1928 in Gaffney, South Carolina.

Ned married first Olene Rebecca Proctor (1933–2014) on January 14, 1950 in Cherokee County, South Carolina. Together they had Glenn Ned Jarrett (b. August 11, 1950). They would divorce some time between then and 1956. Olene would marry again. Ned would also marry again, this time on February 18, 1956 in Catawba County, North Carolina to Martha Ruth Bowman (1931-2023). They remained married until her death and had two children, Dale Arnold Jarrett (b. November 26, 1956) and Patricia Dawn Jarrett (b. August 31, 1959).

Motorsports career results

NASCAR
(key) (Bold – Pole position awarded by qualifying time. Italics – Pole position earned by points standings or practice time. * – Most laps led. ** – All laps led.)

Grand National Series

Daytona 500

References

External links

International Motorsports Hall of Fame
Oceanside Rotary Club of Daytona Beach Hall of Fame
Transcript of Jarrett's July 4, 1984 interview of President Ronald Reagan on MRN Radio 
Talladega Walk of Fame
Account of the 1965 Southern 500
Biography

 

Living people
1932 births
People from Conover, North Carolina
Racing drivers from North Carolina
Motorsport announcers
NASCAR drivers
NASCAR Cup Series champions
American Lutherans
International Motorsports Hall of Fame inductees
Jarrett family
American radio sports announcers
American television sports announcers
NASCAR Hall of Fame inductees